Same-sex marriage has been legal in Querétaro since 13 November 2021. On 22 September 2021, the state Congress passed a law legalizing same-sex marriage in Querétaro. The law was published in the state's official gazette on 12 November, and took effect the following day. Previously, same-sex couples could marry in eight of the eighteen municipalities of Querétaro, comprising 60% of the state's population, despite a state law prohibiting same-sex marriage.

Legal history

Background

The Mexican Supreme Court ruled on 12 June 2015 that state bans on same-sex marriage are unconstitutional nationwide. The court's ruling is considered a "jurisprudential thesis" and did not invalidate state laws, meaning that same-sex couples denied the right to marry would still have to seek individual amparos in court. The ruling standardized the procedures for judges and courts throughout Mexico to approve all applications for same-sex marriages and made the approval mandatory. Specifically, the court ruled that bans on same-sex marriage violate Articles 1 and 4 of the Constitution of Mexico. Article 1 of the Constitution states that "any form of discrimination, based on ethnic or national origin, gender, age, disabilities, social status, medical conditions, religion, opinions, sexual orientation, marital status, or any other form, which violates the human dignity or seeks to annul or diminish the rights and freedoms of the people, is prohibited.", and Article 4 relates to matrimonial equality, stating that "man and woman are equal under the law. The law shall protect the organization and development of the family." ( in Spanish).

In early 2014, two same-sex couples filed an amparo for the right to marry. A court granted the amparo on 11 August 2014. One of the couples, María Fernanda López Gallegos and Mariana Vega, married in Querétaro City on 4 October 2014, and the second couple, Guillermo and Miguel Ángel, married on 17 January 2015 in the same city. Another amparo was requested in the first week of October 2014. It was successful, and the marriage was performed on 28 January 2015. A fourth same-sex marriage took place on 31 January 2015. An amparo involving 55 people was approved by a federal judge on 23 April 2015. It ensured that if any of the 55 people involved wished to marry their partner, they would be legally permitted to do so. By October 2017, 13 amparos for same-sex marriage rights had been granted in Querétaro.

Legislative action
In September 2014, it was announced that the Congress of Querétaro would be considering a civil union bill drafted by the state's ombudsman, Miguel Nava. Originally conceptualized as a same-sex marriage bill, it was then changed to establish civil unions, offering some of the rights and benefits of marriage. On 28 November 2014, Luis Bernardo Nava Guerrero, president of the Congressional Joint Commission, announced that the legislation would be postponed to 2015, though eventually no vote occurred. On 13 June 2016, Eric Salas González, president of the Congress of Querétaro, said that Congress would wait until same-sex marriage is legislated at the federal level before changing local laws.

On 4 February 2016, the Youth Legislature 2016 approved a motion, in a 38–8 vote, expressing support for same-sex marriage.

A bill legalizing same-sex marriage, same-sex concubinage and adoption by same-sex couples was introduced to Congress by Deputy Laura Patricia Polo Herrera of the National Regeneration Movement (MORENA) on 19 December 2018. A spokesman for the conservative National Action Party (PAN) expressed support for an analysis and discussion of the draft bill. Progress on the measure stalled over the following three years due to opposition from conservative lawmakers. In November 2020, Deputy Néstor Domínguez Luna urged Congress to discuss and pass the bill, and in March 2021 a federal judge from the Sixth District Court ordered Congress to debate it. On 22 September 2021, Congress approved the bill in a 20–3 vote. The law was published in the state's official gazette on 12 November, and took effect the following day, Saturday 13 November 2021. It was published by Congress rather than Governor Mauricio Kuri, who had refused to sign the bill into law. The first same-sex marriage performed under the law took place in Querétaro City on 3 December 2021 between Osmin Reyes Manzano and Juan Pablo Dorantes.

Article 137 of the Civil Code of Querétaro was amended to read:
 in Spanish: 
 (Marriage is an institution in which a legal bond is established by the union of two people, who, with equal rights and obligations, are the basis for the birth and stability of a family, as well as the realization of a full and responsible community of life.)

Article 273 of the Civil Code relating to concubinage was also amended:
 in Spanish: 
 (Concubinage is the union of two people, free from marriage, with the purpose of creating a family and realizing a community of life with equal rights and obligations.)

Opponents tried to force a referendum on the legislation. To do this, groups opposed to same-sex marriage had to gather 51,852 valid signatures, representing 3% of the state's voters. In January 2022, the State Electoral Institute (IEEQ) announced that the proposed referendum would not proceed as the groups had only collected 8,186 signatures by the deadline.

Municipalities issuing marriage licenses
Prior to the statewide legalization of same-sex marriage in November 2021, same-sex couples could legally marry without the need to file an amparo in eight municipalities of Querétaro, comprising 60% of the state's population. The civil registrar of Querétaro City announced on 21 July 2015 that the municipality would begin accepting marriage applications from same-sex couples. 7 more municipalities had followed suit by 4 January 2017; they were Amealco de Bonfil, Cadereyta de Montes, Ezequiel Montes, Huimilpan, Pedro Escobedo, San Joaquín, and Tolimán. The municipalities of Colón, Corregidora and Pinal de Amoles reiterated in January 2017 that they explicitly required same-sex couples to receive an amparo in order to get married.

In 2019, in an attempt to stop the issuance of marriage licenses to same-sex couples in Querétaro City, state authorities launched criminal proceedings against Municipal President Luis Bernardo Nava. The municipality stopped issuing licenses in 2019, but decided to begin issuing marriage licenses to same-sex couples again in May 2021.

Marriage statistics
The following table shows the number of same-sex marriages performed in Querétaro as reported by the National Institute of Statistics and Geography. The number of same-sex marriages dropped in 2019 after Querétaro City stopped issuing marriage licenses. Figures for 2020 are also lower than previous years because of the restrictions in place due to the COVID-19 pandemic.

Public opinion
A 2017 opinion poll conducted by Gabinete de Comunicación Estratégica found that 54% of Querétaro's residents supported same-sex marriage, while 43% were opposed.

According to a 2018 survey by the National Institute of Statistics and Geography, 32% of the Querétaro public opposed same-sex marriage.

A 2020 survey by the Autonomous University of Querétaro showed that 63% of Querétaro residents supported same-sex marriage, with support rising to 67% in Querétaro City.

See also
 Same-sex marriage in Mexico
 LGBT rights in Mexico

Notes

References 

Querétaro
Querétaro
2021 in LGBT history